Siphloplecton basale is a species of cleftfooted minnow mayfly in the family Metretopodidae. It is found in all of Canada and the eastern United States.

References

Mayflies
Articles created by Qbugbot
Insects described in 1853